Million Loves in Me is a 2018 Hong Kong-Malaysian drama film directed by Sampson Yuen. The film was inspired by a real court case in Hong Kong.

Synopsis
The film is about a mother and daughter couple suffering from obsessive–compulsive disorder (OCD) whose strange behavior makes them unpopular. A journalist begins investigating them and finds that they keep more than a hundred dogs and cats in their apartment, all in cages. He then reveals his findings to the public but then begins to doubt his actions after seeing Katy, the 45-year-old daughter, arrested by the police.

Cast and roles
John Y - Katy
Koon Lan Lo - Mrs. Fong
Wilson Lee - James
Ruby Yap - Cindy

Production
The films script was written by John Y, a former lawyer, who represented the real Katy in 2002. He was also the producer and the lead actor of the film.

Awards
The film has received the certification of The Malaysia Book of Records for "The Most Number of Awards won by an Independent Feature Film".

References

External links
 IMDb entry

Hong Kong drama films
Malaysian drama films
Hong Kong independent films
Malaysian independent films
Cantonese-language Malaysian films
Chinese-language Malaysian films
2018 independent films
2010s Hong Kong films